Jan David Simon, 3rd Viscount Simon (20 July 1940 – 15 August 2021), was a British hereditary peer and member of the House of Lords.

Biography 
The son of the 2nd Viscount Simon, he was educated at Westminster School and at the School of Navigation, Southampton University. He was further educated at Sydney Technical College. In 1993, he succeeded to his father's viscountcy. Lord Simon was President of the Driving Instructors Association from 2000, and of GEM Motoring Assist from 2004.

He was one of the ninety hereditary peers elected to remain in the House of Lords after the House of Lords Act 1999 and sat for Labour. He died on 15 August 2021, at the age of 81.

He was married to Mary Elizabeth Burns from 1969 until her death in 2020. They had one daughter. The viscountcy became extinct on his death.

Arms

References

External links
 

1940 births
2021 deaths
Labour Party (UK) hereditary peers
People educated at Westminster School, London
3

Hereditary peers elected under the House of Lords Act 1999